Paloorkavu  is a village in Peermade tehsil, Idukki district, Kerala, India. It consists of around 500 residences and one church (St George's) and a temple which is located in the center of the village. A small river flows through this village. Nearby places include  Thekkemala, Mundakkayam and Panchalimedu.

References

Villages in Idukki district